The vertical auto profile (VAP) test is a cholesterol, lipid and lipoprotein test.


Overview
The name "VAP test" uses a technology, the vertical auto profile, to measure and report risk factors for patients who are at increased risk for cardiovascular disease that are not captured by routine cholesterol testing. Its accuracy is unaffected by triglycerides and can be performed in a non-fasting state.

The VAP test has a unique ability to identify far more areas of risk to patients than the standard lipid panel, specifically because it reports 15 separate components versus four in the standard cholesterol test. Studies report that this comprehensive test is able to identify more than twice the number of patients with lipid abnormalities than the standard lipid panel (cholesterol and triglyceride test).

The VAP test directly measures and routinely reports all five lipoprotein classes and sub-classes, including LDL, HDL, intermediate-density lipoprotein (IDL), very low density lipoprotein (VLDL), and lipoprotein (a) [Lp(a)]. In routine cholesterol testing, LDL-cholesterol (LDL-C) is not directly measured, rather it is estimated using the Friedewald equation, is generally inaccurate when patients are not fasting because of its dependence on triglycerides levels in the calculation. Also, estimated LDL-C is falsely low when directly measured LDL-C is < 100 mg/dL or when triglycerides are elevated. The VAP technology also measures and reports LDL particle concentration (LDL-P).

The test meets the American Diabetes Association and American College of Cardiology (ADA-ACC) cholesterol guidelines for people at high risk of heart attack and stroke (including people with Type 2 diabetes mellitus). The ADA-ACC consensus statement establishes measurement and treatment guidelines for Apolipoprotein B|apoB in addition to LDL and non-HDL in high-risk patients.  The VAP test was the first cholesterol profile to comply with updated National Cholesterol Education Program ATP III recommendations for LDL measurement.

The VAP technology is currently owned and operated by VAP Diagnostics Lab, an international company.

Summary of studies:

• In a Johns Hopkins study of 1.34 million patients, up to 60% of patients assessed were misclassified using the Friedewald estimated basic lipid panel, potentially leading to undertreatment of those
patients most at risk.1

• Fasting remnant lipoprotein cholesterol is independently associated with subclinical atherosclerosis: The ELSA-BRASIL Study.2

• Smaller, denser HDL3-C levels are primarily responsible for the inverse association between HDL-C and incident CHD in this diverse group of primary prevention subjects: Jackson Heart Study & Framingham
Offspring Cohort Study.3

• Remnant Lipoprotein cholesterol (RLP-C) levels are an independent predictor of the incidents of CHD in two primary prevention cohorts: Jackson Heart Study & Framingham Offspring Cohort Study.4

• Low HDL3-C, but not HDL2-C or HDL-C, independently increased the risk for long-term hard clinical events in secondary prevention patients: TRIUMPH.5

• The apo A1 remnant ratio was a significant predictor of short and intermediate-term death/myocardial infarction risk among women over 50.6

References

1. Friedewald-estimated versus directly measured low-density lipoprotein cholesterol and treatment implications. J Am Coll Cardiol. 2013 Aug 20;62(8):732-9.

2. Fasting remnant lipoprotein cholesterol is independently associated with subclinical atherosclerosis: The ELSA-BRASIL Study. JACC 5 April 2016 Volume 67, Issue 12.

3. Association of high-density lipoprotein subclasses and incident coronary heart disease: The Jackson Heart and Framingham Offspring Cohort Studies. Eur J Prev Cardiol. 2016 Jan;23(1):41-9.

4. Remnant lipoprotein cholesterol and incident coronary heart disease: The Jackson Heart and Framingham Offspring Cohort Studies. J Am Heart Assoc. 2016 Apr 29;5(5).

5. HDL cholesterol subclasses, myocardial infarction, and mortality in secondary prevention: the Lipoprotein Investigators Collaborative. Eur Heart J. 2015 Jan 1;36(1):22-30.

6. A new ratio for better predicting future death/myocardial infarction than standard lipid measurements in women >50 years undergoing coronary angiography: the apolipoprotein A1 remnant ratio (Apo A1/ [VLDL₃+IDL]). Lipids Health Dis. 2013 Apr 26;12:55.

Blood tests